La Rochelle is a city in Charente-Maritime, France.

La Rochelle may also refer to:

Places
La Rochelle, Manitoba, Canada
Arrondissement of La Rochelle, Charente-Maritime, France
La Rochelle-1, La Rochelle-2, etc.; nine cantons in Charente-Maritime's 1st constituency, France
La Rochelle, Haute-Saône, France
La Rochelle-Normande, Manche, France
La Rochelle, Johannesburg, South Africa
La Rochelle (Zimbabwe), a country estate

Sport
ES La Rochelle, a French association football club
Stade Rochelais, a French rugby union club

Other uses
John of la Rochelle (died 1245), French Franciscan theologian
Pierre Drieu La Rochelle, (1893–1945), French writer
 La Rochelle, a restaurant in Aoyama, Tokyo owned by Hiroyuki Sakai

See also

 
 
 Rochelle (disambiguation)
 Battle of La Rochelle (disambiguation)